The Hollywoodbets Durban July Handicap is a South African Thoroughbred horse race held annually on the first Saturday of July since 1897 at Greyville Racecourse in Durban, KwaZulu-Natal. Raced on turf, the Durban July Handicap is open to horses of all ages. It is South Africa's premier horse racing event and currently offers a purse of R5 million.

First held in July 1897 at a distance of 1 mile (approx 1600m), the distance was modified several times until 1970 when it was changed to its current 2200 meters (11 furlongs).

Field for 2022

Below is the final field for the 2022 Hollywoodbets Durban July to be run at Hollywoodbets Greyville racecourse on Saturday 2nd July, Race 7, 16h00. Should a horse be scratched early, then the reserve runner will take up the barrier position of the scratched horse.

Records
Only five horses have ever won the Durban July Handicap back-to-back. 
 Campanajo (1897, 1898)
 Corriecrian (1907, 1908)
Milesia Pride (1949, 1950)
 El Picha (1999, 2000)
 Do It Again (2018, 2019)
Another horse named Pamphlet won twice in 1918 and 1920

There are three horses with the most runs in the Vodacom Durban July:
 Gondolier: Ran 5 races, finally winning the race in 1985
 Beau Art: Ran 5 races and placed first in 1980
 Flaming Rock won his first Durban July in 1991 and then ran in the race 3 times more before retiring.

Most wins by a trainer: 
 Sydney C. Laird - 7 : (1961, 1963, 1966, 1967, 1971, 1973, 1978)
 Terence M. Millard - 6 : (1983, 1984, 1986, 1988, 1989, 1990)

Trainer F. Murray won the race four years in a row from 1910 through 1913.

Most wins by a jockey:
 5 : Anton Marcus (1993, 2000, 2005, 2007, 2018)
 4 :  Harold "Tiger" Wright - (1942, 1947, 1949, 1955), Anthony Delpech (1998, 2004, 2010, 2011) Piere Strydom (2016,2012, 2001, 1996)
 3 : Bertie Hayden (1971, 1973, 1978), Felix Coetzee (1984, 1988, 1990), Richard Fourie (2014, 2019, 2020)

Of note to North American racing fans, the 1963 race was won by Colorado King who subsequently raced in California and won the 1964 Hollywood Gold Cup plus set a World Record for nine furlongs in winning the American Handicap at Hollywood Park Racetrack. As well, the 2002 winner, Ipi Tombe, became the first horse bred in Zimbabwe to ever win a race at historic Churchill Downs in Louisville, Kentucky.

In 2013, S'manga Khumalo became the first black African jockey to win the Vodacom Durban July when riding Heavy Metal to victory for trainer Sean Tarry.

In 2017, Candice Bass-Robinson became the first female trainer to win the Vodacom Durban July following the victory of Marinaresco. In 2021, Michelle Rix, along with her father Harold Crawford, became the second female trainer with the victory by Kommetdieding.

In 2021, Ashwin Reynolds became the first owner of colour to own a Vodacom Durban July winner following the victory of Kommetdieding.

Winners of the Durban July Handicap since 1978

Winners from 1897 to 2021

References

 Website for the Durban July
 SAHorseRacing.com

Horse races in South Africa
Open middle distance horse races
Recurring sporting events established in 1897
Winter events in South Africa